"Hold On" is a song written and recorded by American nu metal band Korn, The Matrix, and Atticus Ross for Korn's untitled eighth studio album. It was released as the album's second single in October 2007.

Music and structure
Munky describes the song as "the closest thing to an original Korn song" on the untitled album. It is one of the four songs on the untitled album to feature Brooks Wackerman of Bad Religion on drums.

Concept
The message in "Hold On" stems from Jonathan Davis' near-fatal blood disorder in 2006, and is dubbed by Davis as a "song of empowerment".

Chart performance
The song was released as a digital single in the UK, failing to chart. A promotional single was also released in Germany, and the United States, where it managed to peak in the top ten of the Billboard Mainstream Rock Songs chart in February 2008. It became their last successful single of the 2000s.

Charts

Music video
The music video for "Hold On" features the band in a rodeo setting and with Munky and Jonathan Davis trying to "hold on" to their bulls in order to win a bullriding contest. The video is dedicated to late bullrider Lane Frost, who died on July 30, 1989 as a result of injuries sustained after dismounting his bull.

Viral campaign
To promote the release of the video, several viral videos and an accompanying website were produced advertising "Ballsville Beef Parts", which featured the residents of Ballsville and the members of Korn playing various bullriders. One of these videos is a fake news interview with Davis, in character as J.D. Kornuto.

Appearances in media
"Hold On" is featured in a commercial for the 2008 Ford Focus. This commercial was first broadcast during Game 4 of the 2007 World Series between the Colorado Rockies and Boston Red Sox on October 28, 2007. The song was the second one played during the 2007 World's Strongest Man competition. the song appeared in the end credits of the 2007 video game Replay: Shattered Memories and it's 2008 South Korea Animation  film version Replay VII.

Track listing

UK digital download
"Hold On" – 3:05
"Evolution (Dave Audé Remix)" – 7:38
"Sing Sorrow" – 4:35

German promo
"Hold On" – 3:03

See also

Notes

External links
www.ballsvillebeefparts.com
www.ballsville.com

2007 singles
Korn songs
Song recordings produced by the Matrix (production team)
Song recordings produced by Atticus Ross
2007 songs
EMI Records singles
Virgin Records singles
Songs written by Reginald Arvizu
Songs written by Lauren Christy
Songs written by Jonathan Davis
Songs written by Graham Edwards (musician)
Songs written by James Shaffer
Songs written by Scott Spock